Francisco Javier "Javi" Gómez Torrijos (born 23 July 1982) is a retired Spanish footballer who played as a forward.

He never played higher than Segunda División B, where he totalled 310 games and 79 goals across 14 seasons in service of ten clubs. Gómez received international fame for a goal he scored from a long-range overhead kick for Socuéllamos in 2016.

Football career
Gómez was born in Cuenca, Castilla-La Mancha, and began his career at hometown club UB Conquense. He made his debut on 18 February 2001 as a second-half substitute in a 0–1 home loss in the season's Segunda División B, and had another cameo as they defeated CD Binéfar in a play-off to remain in the division.

In 2004, he left for Tercera División's La Roda CF, and spent the following season at CF Gimnástico Alcázar in the same division, before returning to Conquense, now also in the fourth tier. After a nine-goal season in the league above in 2008–09, he transferred to AD Ceuta on 17 June 2009, signing a one-year deal with the option for a second. Halfway through his first campaign for the Caballa team, he reached an agreement to leave and switched to SD Eibar; the Basques competed for the promotion play-offs.

Gómez spent the next two years at CD Puertollano and Ontinyent CF, respectively. In 2013–14 he scored 18 goals for Lucena CF, including a hat-trick in a 3–2 win over Arroyo CP on 10 November.

After a play-off reaching season with UCAM Murcia CF, Gómez signed for UD Socuéllamos of his native region on 3 July 2015. He received international recognition on 24 April when he scored the only goal of a home game against CD Toledo, through a 30-yard bicycle kick;  despite speculation, it was overlooked for the FIFA Puskás Award. He moved to the latter club the following 24 June.

References

External links
Villarrobledo official profile 

1982 births
Living people
People from Cuenca, Spain
Sportspeople from the Province of Cuenca
Spanish footballers
Footballers from Castilla–La Mancha
Association football forwards
Segunda División B players
Tercera División players
UB Conquense footballers
AD Ceuta footballers
SD Eibar footballers
CD Puertollano footballers
Ontinyent CF players
Lucena CF players
UCAM Murcia CF players
CD Toledo players
Mérida AD players
CF Gimnástico Alcázar players
La Roda CF players